Bill Price (3 September 1944 – 22 December 2016) was an English record producer and audio engineer who worked with The Clash, The Sex Pistols, Guns N' Roses, Sparks, The Jesus and Mary Chain, The Nymphs, The Waterboys, Mott the Hoople and Simon Townshend (Pete Townshend's younger brother). He was chief engineer on the first three solo albums by Pete Townshend, including Empty Glass and White City: A Novel.

He contributed to documentaries about The Clash such as Westway To The World. Price started his audio engineering career in the mid-1960s when he was an engineer at Decca Studios in West Hampstead, recording artists such as Tom Jones.

One of the final recordings he helped engineer at Decca before departing to AIR Studios in November 1969 was the multi-million-selling "Reflections of My Life" by The Marmalade.

Price helped build AIR Studios in Oxford Street, where he spent many years. During that time he engineered some of the major albums of the 1970s and 1980s

Sex Pistols
In 1976, he was asked by Malcolm McLaren to produce the Sex Pistols' sessions that became the Never Mind the Bollocks, Here's the Sex Pistols album. His work with the band led to one of his most curious album credits, alongside Chris Thomas. Price explained:

During the media furore over the Sex Pistol's single God Save the Queen, Price, Thomas and Pistols' vocalist Johnny Rotten were subject to a razor attack outside a pub in Highbury, London.

Other work 

Price also mixed Nilsson's "Without You".

He was the chief engineer/manager at Wessex Studios, the London studio where the Clash and the Sex Pistols recorded much of their work.

More recently he worked again with Mick Jones in his band Carbon/Silicon, and mixed the Veils' albums Nux Vomica and Time Stays, We Go.

References

1944 births
2016 deaths
English audio engineers
English record producers
20th-century British businesspeople